Chaiyong Khumpiam, is a Thai retired football player. He played for the national team between 1991 and 1999.

He is currently a sport commentator for PPTV.

Personal life
Chaiyong's son, Sahawit Khumpiam, is also a goalkeeper.

Honours

Player
Police United
Thai Division 1 League: 1999

Manager
Police Tero
Thai Division 1 League: 2006, 2009

References 

1965 births
Living people
Chaiyong Khumpiam
Chaiyong Khumpiam
1992 AFC Asian Cup players
Footballers at the 1990 Asian Games
Footballers at the 1998 Asian Games
Chaiyong Khumpiam
Southeast Asian Games medalists in football
Association football goalkeepers
Competitors at the 1991 Southeast Asian Games
Chaiyong Khumpiam
Chaiyong Khumpiam
Chaiyong Khumpiam
Chaiyong Khumpiam
Chaiyong Khumpiam
Chaiyong Khumpiam